The Houston Open is a squash tournament held in Houston in the Life Time Athletic Club in May. It is part of the PSA World Tour.

Past Results

References

External links
- Official website
- SquashSite The Houston Open 2016 page
- PSA The Houston Open 2016

Squash tournaments in the United States
Squash in Texas